Sithathor (daughter of Hathor) was an ancient Egyptian princess with the title king's daughter. She is only known from her burial at Dahshur. Next to the pyramid of king Senusret III were found underground galleries as a burial place for royal women. Most of the burials were found looted, but there were two boxes for jewellery overlooked by tomb robbers. Both boxes contained an outstanding collection of jewellery. They were called the first and the second treasure of Dahshur. The first treasure was discovered on 6 March 1894 and belonged most likely once to Sithathor. Several scarabs with her name were found. The treasure contained a pectoral with the names of king Senusret II, one of the masterpieces of Egyptian goldwork. Other objects were golden shells, golden bracelets, a mirror and several stone vases. Sithathor is not known for sure outside her tomb. She was perhaps a daughter of Senusret III, but it is also possible that she was the daughter of Senusret II and buried as sister of king Senusret III next to him.

Literature 
 Jacques Jean Marie de Morgan: Fouilles a Dahchour, Mars-Juin 1894, Wien 1895, p. 60-64
 Dieter Arnold: The Pyramid Complex of Senwosret III at Dahshur, Architectural Studies, New York 2002, p. 70 

Princesses of the Twelfth Dynasty of Egypt
19th-century BC women